The Order of Friars Minor (also called the Franciscans, the Franciscan Order, or the Seraphic Order; postnominal abbreviation OFM) is a mendicant Catholic religious order, founded in 1209 by Francis of Assisi. The order adheres to the teachings and spiritual disciplines of the founder and of his main associates and followers, such as Clare of Assisi, Anthony of Padua, and Elizabeth of Hungary, among many others. The Order of Friars Minor is the largest of the contemporary First Orders within the Franciscan movement.

Francis began preaching around 1207 and traveled to Rome to seek approval of his order from Pope Innocent III in 1209.  The original Rule of Saint Francis approved by the pope disallowed ownership of property, requiring members of the order to beg for food while preaching.  The austerity was meant to emulate the life and ministry of Jesus Christ. Franciscans traveled and preached in the streets, while boarding in church properties. The extreme poverty required of members was relaxed in the final revision of the Rule in 1223.  The degree of observance required of members remained a major source of conflict within the order, resulting in numerous secessions.
 
The Order of Friars Minor, previously known as the Observant branch (postnominal abbreviation OFM Obs.), is one of the three Franciscan First Orders within the Catholic Church, the others being the Capuchins (postnominal abbreviation OFM Cap.) and Conventuals (postnominal abbreviation OFM Conv). The Order of Friars Minor, in its current form, is the result of an amalgamation of several smaller Franciscan orders (e.g. Alcantarines, Recollects, Reformanti, etc.), completed in 1897 by Pope Leo XIII. The Capuchin and Conventual remain distinct religious institutes within the Catholic Church, observing the Rule of Saint Francis with different emphases. Franciscans are sometimes referred to as minorites or greyfriars because of their habit. In Poland and Lithuania they are known as Bernardines, after Bernardino of Siena, although the term elsewhere refers rather to Cistercians.

Name and demographics

The "Order of Friars Minor" are commonly called simply the "Franciscans". This Order is a mendicant religious order of men that traces its origin to Francis of Assisi. Their official Latin name is the Ordo Fratrum Minorum  Which is the name Francis gave his brotherhood. Having been born among the minorum (serfs, second class citizens), before his conversion, he aspired to move up the social ladder to the maggiorum (nobles, first class citizens). After a life of conversion, the name of his brotherhood (Order of Second-Class Brothers) indicates his coming to an appreciation of his social condition on behalf of those who have no class or citizenship in society. 

The modern organization of the Friars Minor comprises several separate families or groups, each considered a religious order in its own right under its own minister General and particular type of governance. They all live according to a body of regulations known as the Rule of St Francis. These are

The Order of Friars Minor 
The Order of Friars Minor, known as the "Observants", most commonly simply called Franciscan friars, official name: "Friars Minor" (OFM).  According to the 2013 Annuario Pontificio, the OFM has 2,212 communities; 14,123 members; 9,735 priests

Order of Friars Minor Capuchin 
The Order of Friars Minor Capuchin or simply Capuchins, official name: "Friars Minor Capuchin" (OFM Cap). it has 1,633 communities; 10,786 members; 7,057 priests

Conventual Franciscans 
The Conventual Franciscans or Minorites, official name: "Friars Minor Conventual" (OFM Conv).  It has 667 communities; 4,289 members; 2,921 priests

Third Order Regular of Saint Francis 
Third Order Regular of Saint Francis (TOR): 176 communities; 870 members; 576 priests

History

Beginnings
A sermon on Mt 10:9 which Francis heard in 1209 made such an impression on him that he decided to fully devote himself  to a life of apostolic poverty. Clad in a rough garment, barefoot, and, after the Evangelical precept, without staff or scrip, he began to preach repentance.

The mendicant orders had long been exempt from the jurisdiction of the bishop, and enjoyed (as distinguished from the secular clergy) unrestricted freedom to preach and hear confessions in the churches connected with their monasteries. This had led to endless friction and open quarrels between the two divisions of the clergy. This question was definitively settled by the Council of Trent.

Separate congregations
Amid numerous dissensions in the 14th century, a number of separate congregations sprang up, almost of sects, to say nothing of the heretical parties of the Beghards and Fraticelli, some of which developed within the order on both hermit and cenobitic principles. 
The Clareni or Clarenini, an association of hermits established on the river Clareno in the march of Ancona by Angelo da Clareno after the suppression of the Franciscan Celestines by Boniface VIII. Like several other smaller congregations, it was obliged in 1568 under Pope Pius V to unite with the general body of Observantists. 
 The quasi-Observantist brothers living under the rule of the Conventual ministers (Martinianists or "Observantes sub ministris"), such as the male Colletans, later led by Boniface de Ceva in his reform attempts principally in France and Germany;
 The reformed congregation founded in 1426 by the Spaniard Philip de Berbegal and distinguished by the special importance they attached to the little hood (cappuciola);
 The Neutri, a group of reformers originating about 1463 in Italy, who tried to take a middle ground between the Conventuals and Observantists, but refused to obey the heads of either, until they were compelled by the pope to affiliate with the regular Observantists, or with those of the Common Life;
 The Caperolani, a congregation founded about 1470 in North Italy by Peter Caperolo, but dissolved on the death of its founder in 1481;

Rule on property 
A difference of opinion developed in the community concerning the interpretation of the rule regarding property. The Observants held to a strict interpretation that the friars may not hold any property either individually nor communally. The literal and unconditional observance of this was rendered impracticable by the great expansion of the order, its pursuit of learning, and the accumulated property of the large cloisters in the towns. Regulations were drafted by which all alms donated were held by custodians appointed by the Holy See, who would make distributions upon request. It was John XXII who had introduced Conventualism in the sense of community of goods, income, and property as in other religious orders, in contradiction to Observantism or the strict observance of the rule. Pope Martin V, in the Brief Ad statum of 23 August 1430, allowed the Conventuals to hold property like all other orders.

Attempted union between branches 
Projects for a union between the two main branches of the order were put forth not only by the Council of Constance but by several popes, without any positive result. By direction of Pope Martin V, John of Capistrano drew up statutes which were to serve as a basis for reunion, and they were actually accepted by a general chapter at Assisi in 1430; but the majority of the Conventual houses refused to agree to them, and they remained without effect. 

Equally unsuccessful were the attempts of the Franciscan Pope Sixtus IV, who bestowed a vast number of privileges on both original mendicant orders, but by this very fact lost the favor of the Observants and failed in his plans for reunion. Julius II succeeded in doing away with some of the smaller branches, but left the division of the two great parties untouched. This division was finally legalized by Leo X, after a general chapter held in Rome in 1517, in connection with the reform movement of the Fifth Lateran Council, had once more declared the impossibility of reunion. Leo X summoned on 11 July 1516 a general chapter to meet at Rome on the feast of Pentecost 31 May 1517. This chapter suppressed all the reformed congregations and annexed them to the Observants; it then declared the Observants an independent order, and separated them completely from the Conventuals. The less strict principles of the Conventuals, permitting the possession of real estate and the enjoyment of fixed revenues, were recognized as tolerable, while the Observants, in contrast to this usus moderatus, were held strictly to their own usus arctus or pauper.

Unification
All of the groups that followed the Franciscan Rule literally were united to the Observants, and the right to elect the Minister General of the Order, together with the seal of the order, was given to the group united under the Observants. This grouping, since it adhered more closely to the rule of the founder, was allowed to claim a certain superiority over the Conventuals. The Observant general (elected now for six years, not for life) inherited the title of "Minister-General of the Whole Order of St. Francis" and was granted the right to confirm the choice of a head for the Conventuals, who was known as "Master-General of the Friars Minor Conventual"—although this privilege never became practically operative.

In 1875, the Kulturkampf expelled the majority of the German Franciscans, most of whom settled in North America.

Habit
The habit has been gradually changed in colour and certain other details. Its colour, which was at first grey or a medium brown, is now a dark brown. The dress, which consists of a loose sleeved gown, is confined by a white cord, from which is hung, since the fifteenth century, the  Seraphic Rosary with its seven decades. Sandals are substituted for shoes. Around the neck and over the shoulders hangs the cowl.

Saints and Beati

Canonized

Beatified

Notable people
 

Pál Bajai, 18th century friar and writer

See also
List of Ministers General of the Order of Friars Minor
Association of Franciscan Colleges and Universities

References

Notes

Sources
Books
 

 
 
 
 
 
 
 
 
 
 
 —4 volumes

 
 
 
 
 
 
 
 
 —Shows how Franciscans shifted away from an early emphasis on poverty and humility and instead emphasized educational roles

Articles

External links

 Order of Friars Minor – official website
 Digital Franciscans – extensive list of Franciscan internet resources
 Franciscan authors, 13th–18th century
 Online guide to the Academy of American Franciscan History Microfilm Collection, 1526–1972 – collection by The Bancroft Library
 Luke Wadding Papers – correspondence relating to Luke Wadding OFM and the Irish Friars Minor at St. Isidore's College, Rome, on ecclesiastical and political matters; and concerning his interests as historian of the Franciscan Order
 Franciscan Faith: Sacred Art in Ireland 1600–1750 – permanent exhibition of church silver in the National Museum of Ireland
W. J. GÓRCZYK, BRIEF HISTORY OF THE CHURCH AND FORMER REFORMATI ORDER'S MONASTERY IN WĘGRÓW Franciscans – Reformati of Poland.

 
Catholic religious orders established in the 13th century
1209 establishments in Europe
13th-century Catholicism